No. 660 Squadron was a Royal Air Force Air Observation Post squadron associated with the 21st Army Group during World War II. Numbers 651 to 663 Squadrons of the RAF were Air Observation Post units working closely with Army units in artillery spotting and liaison. A further three of these squadrons, 664–666, were manned with Canadian personnel. Their duties and squadron numbers were transferred to the Army with the formation of the Army Air Corps on 1 September 1957.

History

Formation and World War II
No. 660 Squadron was formed at RAF Old Sarum on 31 July 1943 with the Auster III and in February 1944 the Auster IV. From November 1943, it was based at Hammerwood Park, a country house in Sussex. However, as the squadron's role was to support the Second British Army, in July 1944 it moved to France. Fighting in the break-out from Normandy it followed the army across the low countries and into Germany. The squadron disbanded at Holtenau, Germany on 31 May 1946.

Aircraft operated

See also
List of Royal Air Force aircraft squadrons

References

Notes

Bibliography

External links
 Squadron history for nos. 651–670 sqn. at RAF Web
 660 sqn. page of RAF website

Aircraft squadrons of the Royal Air Force in World War II
660 Squadron
Military units and formations established in 1943